Petro Trochanowski or Piotr Trochanowski (born 10 August 1947) was born in Parchów, Silesia in the southwestern part of Poland to Lemko parents from Binczarowa.  He is the editor of Besida, published in Krynica since 1989.  He is a spokesperson for the Lemko ethnic group in Poland and internationally. He is also published under the pseudonym  Petro Murianka.
  
He was the first person who was not an ethnic Pole to win the Stanisław Piętak Prize.

Discography

Publications
  
 
 
 
  
 Besida (editor)

Honors
 Constantine Ostrogski Prize

References

External links
"In the television, Ruthenians are shown as bare-footed peasants living in primitive wooden cottages. They can sing, play on strange old instruments, but never drive Western cars or run enterprises"
Lemkos
A small sample of his works
2002 Chepa Bear and Aleksander Dukhnovich Prize
Lemko Revival

1947 births
Living people
People from Polkowice County
Lemkos
Polish poets
Rusyn poets
Polish folk musicians
Polish people of Rusyn descent